St. Martin of Tours Episcopal Church is a historic stone Episcopal church building located at 2312 J Street in the South Omaha district of Omaha, Nebraska. Built in 1899 in the Late Gothic Revival style, it was designated an Omaha Landmark and listed on the National Register of Historic Places in 1982. It was the first Episcopal church established in South Omaha when the town was being developed. It is the only surviving Episcopal church in this community, which was settled chiefly by Catholic immigrants.

History 
The Very Reverend Frank Millspaugh, dean of Trinity Cathedral, founded St. Martin in 1876. Millspaugh and his successor George Worthington founded most of the Episcopal churches in Omaha. St. Martin was the first Episcopal church built when the former independent town of South Omaha was new.

The church's architecture was influenced by the Oxford Movement, which revived elements of historical Christian church styles and worship of the Middle Ages. The limestone for the church was salvaged from the remains of the Ralston mansion of Dr. George L. Miller, which burned down in the late 1880s.

As South Omaha developed rapidly, attracting many waves of immigrants from Eastern and Southern Europe, the Episcopal church established new missions in the area. But, most of the immigrants were Catholic and established their own churches to continue their traditions. St. Martin of Tours is the only Episcopal church remaining in this area of Omaha. to

See also 
 Omaha Landmarks

References

External links 

 St. Martin of Tours Episcopal Church official website.
 Modern photo.

Landmarks in South Omaha, Nebraska
National Register of Historic Places in Omaha, Nebraska
Episcopal church buildings in Nebraska
Churches in Omaha, Nebraska
Religious organizations established in 1876
Churches completed in 1899
19th-century Episcopal church buildings
Gothic Revival church buildings in Nebraska
Churches on the National Register of Historic Places in Nebraska
1876 establishments in Nebraska